Hoy con Cesar Hildebrandt was a political television show, hosted by the polemical Peruvian journalist César Hildebrandt.

Peruvian television series
Television news shows